The Cope Depot, or Manchester and Augusta Railroad Station in Cope, South Carolina was a privately owned railroad depot built in 1893. It was built by the Manchester and Augusta Railroad six years before being acquired by the Seaboard Air Line Railroad. The depot is located along what is today the CSX Orangeburg Subdivision, and was added to the National Register of Historic Places in 2001.

Gallery

See also
Cope, South Carolina

References

Railway stations on the National Register of Historic Places in South Carolina
History of South Carolina
Railway stations in the United States opened in 1893
Buildings and structures in Orangeburg County, South Carolina
Atlantic Coast Line Railroad stations
National Register of Historic Places in Orangeburg County, South Carolina
Former railway stations in South Carolina